The following is a list of government cabinets of Yugoslavia.

List of cabinets

External links
Monarchy governments 
Republican governments

Cabinets
Yugoslavia